Edgar Derry Tillyer (December 7, 1881 – December 25, 1970) was an astronomer, computer and lens designer who was the director of research at the American Optical Company.  The Optical Society established an award for distinction in the field of vision which is named in his honor, as he was the first award winner in 1954.

Born in Dover, New Jersey, Tillyer attended Dover High School,  earned his undergraduate degree from Rutgers University and a Master's from George Washington University.

See also
 Anna Estelle Glancy

References

1881 births
1970 deaths
American astronomers
George Washington University alumni
Optical engineers
People from Dover, New Jersey
Rutgers University alumni
Scientists from New Jersey